Khugaev or Khugayev is a surname. Notable people with the surname include:

 Alan Khugaev (born 1989), Russian wrestler
 Gerasim Khugayev (born 1946), South Ossetian politician
 Gocha Khugaev (born 1984), Russian Paralympic athlete
 Khetag Khugaev (born 1997), Russian weightlifter
 Rolan Khugayev (born 1985), Russian footballer
 Rostislav Khugayev (born 1951), South Ossetian politician

Russian-language surnames